ThunderCats is an American science fantasy animated television series that was produced by Rankin/Bass Animated Entertainment and Leisure Concepts debuting in 1985, based on the characters created by Ted "Tobin" Wolf. The series, for which Leonard Starr was the head writer, follows the adventures of a group of catlike humanoid aliens. The animation for the episodes was provided by the Japanese studio Pacific Animation Corporation, with Masaki Iizuka as production manager. The studio was acquired in 1989 to form Walt Disney Animation Japan. Season 1 of the show aired in 1985, consisting of 65 episodes, followed by a TV movie entitled ThunderCats – Ho! in 1986. Seasons 2, 3, and 4 each contained twenty episodes, starting with a five-part story.

The series was originally distributed by Rankin/Bass' then-parent company Telepictures Corporation, which would later merge with Lorimar Productions in 1986. In 1989, Lorimar-Telepictures was purchased by and folded into Warner Bros., whose television syndication arm would eventually assume distribution of the show; Warner Bros. had the rights to the series (and all Lorimar-Telepictures programming) from that point on. Leisure Concepts which helped co-develop the show acted as a licensing agent for the series.

It also aired on Cartoon Network as part of the Toonami block.

There were also several comic book series produced: Marvel Comics' version (currently owned by Warner Bros. rival Disney), 1985 to 1988; and five series by Wildstorm, an imprint of DC Comics (Warner Bros.' corporate sibling), beginning in 2003. Items of clothing featuring the ThunderCats logo and DVD box sets of the original series have enjoyed a resurgence in recent years as nostalgia for the former children's favorite has grown.

A film adaptation of the series was announced in June 2007; Aurelio Jaro was making a CGI-animated feature film of ThunderCats, based on a script written by Paul Sopocy. Jerry O'Flaherty, veteran video game art director, had signed on to direct. The film was planned to be produced by Spring Creek Productions. It was originally set for a summer 2010 release, but the movie has since been put on hold. Concept art for the film has also been leaked online.

Production
The first season cost $15 million to make.

Plot 
ThunderCats follows the adventures of the eponymous team of heroes, cat-like humanoid aliens on a planet called Third Earth. The series plot begins with the dying planet Thundera meeting its end, forcing the ThunderCats (a sort of Thunderean nobility) to flee their homeworld. The fleet is attacked by the Thundereans' enemies, the Mutants of Plun-Darr, who destroy most of the starships in the "ThunderFleet", but spare the flagship hoping to capture the legendary mystic Sword of Omens they believe is on board. The sword holds the Eye of Thundera, the source of the ThunderCats' power, which is embedded in the hilt. Though the Mutants damage the flagship, the power of the Eye drives them back. The damage to the ship means the journey to their original destination is not possible, instead having to journey to "Third Earth", which will take much longer than they had anticipated. The eldest of the ThunderCats, Jaga, volunteers to pilot the ship while the others sleep in capsules; however, he dies of old age in the process, but not before ensuring they will reach their destination safely. The flagship contains the young Lord of the ThunderCats, Lion-O, as well as the ThunderCats Cheetara, Panthro, Tygra, WilyKit and WilyKat, and Snarf.

When the ThunderCats awaken from their suspended animation on Third Earth after ten "galacto-years", Lion-O discovers that his suspension capsule has slowed, rather than stopped, his aging. He has now become essentially a child in the body of an adult. Together, the ThunderCats and the friendly natives of Third Earth construct the "Cat's Lair", their new home and headquarters, but before long, the Mutants have tracked them down to Third Earth. The intrusion of these two alien races upon the world does not go unnoticed, however, as a demonic, mummified sorcerer calling himself Mumm-Ra recruits the Mutants to aid him in his campaign to acquire the Eye of Thundera and destroy the ThunderCats so that his evil may continue to hold sway over Third Earth.

Seasons

Season 1 
The basic plot above holds strong for the first season of the show, and served as the basis for a vast array of stories that freely mixed elements of science fiction and fantasy into a traditional good-versus-evil tale that steadily introduced more and more recurring allies and villains into the world of the ThunderCats. Futuristic technology is just as central to the series as magic and myth, but even in the midst of all this action, the series never underemphasizes the importance of moral values in solving problems. Each episode would normally include a short dénouement, featuring the characters recuperating after the events of the story and taking the time to single out a personal value or wholesome approach that helped save the day, or could have done so if they had seen it.

The first half of Season 1 featured a gentle continuity, with early episodes following on from one another and establishing recurring concepts, although this became less common as the season transitioned into its second half, which comprised mostly incidental one-shot adventures. Tying the second half of season one together was the overarching five-part adventure written by series head writer Leonard Starr, "Lion-O's Annointment", in which an unarmed Lion-O faced off against first each of the other ThunderCats, and then Mumm-Ra, so he could truly earn his title as Lord of the ThunderCats. The five parts were:

 "Day One: The Trial Of Strength" – Lion-O had to out-do Panthro in a strength contest.
 "Day Two: The Trial Of Speed" – Lion-O had to beat Cheetara in a race.
 "Day Three: The Trial Of Cunning" – Lion-O had to outwit both of the "ThunderKittens", WilyKat and WilyKit, in an underground location.
 "Day Four: The Trial Of Mind-Power" – Lion-O was pitted against Tygra in a mind-based challenge.
 "Last Day: The Trial Of Evil" – Lion-O had to defeat Mumm-Ra. In his "Trial Of Evil", Lion-O discovered that Mumm-Ra was highly dependent on the sarcophagus inside which he had been mummified.

On all four days except the last, the Mutants tried to interfere with Lion-O's trials so that they could force the ThunderCats to remain leaderless. The other ThunderCats were each then forced to involve themselves in the conflict specifically to foil the Mutants's interferences—all while trying to avoid assisting Lion-O in his anointment trials.

Although intended to be viewed consecutively (as the adventures depicted occurred one day after the other), the five parts of the mini-series were erroneously aired (and released on DVD) with multiple other episodes between each instalment.

ThunderCats – Ho! 
The 1986 TV movie ThunderCats – Ho! featured the first major shake-up to the status quo of the series, introducing three new Thundereans (whom Lion-O later anointed as ThunderCats) who had also survived the destruction of Thundera. A massive cast of returning heroes and villains were incorporated into the story and concluded with the apparent destruction of Mumm-Ra. Leonard Starr wrote the story for this TV movie. ThunderCats – Ho! was then split into five instalments, becoming the initial episodes of season two.

Season 2 
When the series returned in 1987, it was revealed that the evil wizard Mumm-Ra had survived. "ThunderCats – Ho!" and its follow-up, "Mumm-Ra Lives!", set the pattern for the following three seasons, each of which began with a five-part mini-series—again written by Leonard Starr—that established the new characters and concepts that would go on to influence the rest of the season. In the case of "Mumm-Ra Lives!", these concepts included the debut of the villainous Lunataks, which became a third faction that existed for the rest of the series, and the new team of ThunderCats from ThunderCats – Ho! receiving their own headquarters and vehicles.

Season 3 
The 1988 season began with the Peter Lawrence-scripted "ThunderCubs"  which, though named for its plot about the ThunderCats being transformed into children, was principally about Mumm-Ra reconstructing Thundera in order to retrieve both the weapon that had originally destroyed it (the Sword of Plun-Darr) and the legendary Treasure of Thundera. In the course of the adventure, the treasure—containing the Book of Omens, a tome holding all the secrets of the ThunderCats, and many other mystical items—was scattered across the New Thundera, ushering in a new concept for the series: a season with an actual story arc. Continuity between episodes became tighter as the ThunderCats, Mutants, Lunataks and Mumm-Ra alternated their adventures between Third Earth and New Thundera, searching for the treasure and exploiting its powers. The season also featured the running theme of the Ancient Spirits of Evil having to take a more active hand in pushing Mumm-Ra into action, culminating in another unique feature of the season—an actual finale episode, "The Last Day", in which the Ancient Spirits of Evil give Mumm-Ra one last chance to destroy the ThunderCats by sunset. Besides demonstrating their threat by making Ma-Mutt disappear, the Ancient Spirits of Evil stated that Mumm-Ra's failure will also have the Mutants and the Lunataks removed from Third Earth as well. Ultimately, Mumm-Ra failed and the Ancient Spirits of Evil exiled him to the farthest corner of the Universe.

Season 4 
In the opening miniseries, Peter Lawrence's "Return to Thundera!", the ThunderCats returned to New Thundera to rebuild their society, but before departing, they destroyed Mumm-Ra's pyramid. This enraged the Ancient Spirits of Evil to the point that they brought Mumm-Ra back and installed him within a new pyramid on New Thundera. The season proved to be quite divorced from what had gone before, with adventures consigned almost entirely to New Thundera, and most villainous opposition coming from either Mumm-Ra or assorted new villains. The Mutants, Lunataks, and Captain Cracker all returned for one episode each. However, in the series finale, several conclusions are reached:
 Mumm-Ra stands up to and successfully asserts himself over the Ancient Spirits of Evil.
 The mystery of the Book of Omens is at last solved.
 The tumultuous and terrifying environment of Thundera is at last rendered peaceful and pristine.

Cast 

Despite its large cast of characters, ThunderCats featured a rather small circle of voice actors, with only six actors providing voices for the entire first season. Every actor provided multiple voices, although the distinctive baritone of Earle Hyman (Panthro) left the actor providing only very occasional guest voices in comparison with his fellow performers. In particular, as the first season's only female actor, Lynne Lipton (Cheetara and WilyKit) provided voices for every single female character that appeared in the season. Earl Hammond (Mumm-Ra and Jaga) and Bob McFadden (Snarf and Slythe) would most regularly provide the voices of guest characters.

1986's "Thundercats—Ho!" added Gerrianne Raphael to the cast as the voice of Pumyra, while 1987's "Mumm-Ra Lives!" saw the addition of Doug Preis as the voice of Alluro.

DVD releases

Volumes 

Warner Home Video/Warner Bros. Family Entertainment released the entire original 1980s series of ThunderCats in the US over a number of volumes in the following order:

Complete series 
Warner Home Video have released the entire ThunderCats series in the UK in the following order:

Reception 
In January 2009, IGN named ThunderCats as the 49th-best show in the Top 100 Best Animated TV Shows.

Spinoffs

Film 
On 16 November 1987, a VHS called 'Thundercats Ho!' was released in the UK by Video Collection International. The film was submitted to the BBFC, who recorded it being 90 m 31s excluding 5 seconds cut for a Universal rating. It was actually the first five episodes of season 2 edited to look like a feature-length film. Season 2 never aired in the UK. This VHS may have been shown on American TV by stations without access to the individual episodes.

In 2008–2009, Warner Bros. was in the process of creating a CGI animated film based on ThunderCats. It was rumored to be an original story expanding on the events of the first episode and the film's concept artwork (released in July 2009) contained the main character Lion-O and three locations. A two-minute test scene was filmed and presented to Warner Bros.; however, the movie has been put on indefinite hold, perhaps due to the critical and commercial failure of the 2008 movie Speed Racer (another Warner Bros. CGI project).

2011 series 

A new ThunderCats animated series produced by Warner Bros. Animation began airing on Cartoon Network from July 2011. Animation production was provided by Japanese animation studio Studio 4°C. Sam Register was the executive producer and was joined by Michael Jelenic and Ethan Spaulding as the producers for the series. The show explained Lion-O's ascension to the Thunderean throne with a more original feel and darker style than the 1980s series. The new series made it clear in the very beginning, however, that they are not adhering to the original story line. In the original series the Thunder Cats leave Thundera, as the last of their race, to eventually arrive on the 3rd earth. In the new series the very first line states that the Thundereans are already on the 3rd earth. As the first few episodes progress the new writers seem to use Thundera but it isn't clear if they are referring to a planet or kingdom. Former Lion-O voice actor Larry Kenney returned to play the role Lion-O's father Claudus in the opening two-part episode of the new series.

In January 2011, a promotional poster featuring re-imagined designs for Lion-O, Cheetara, Panthro, and Tygra as well as design for the Sword of Omens and vehicles were shown at the London Toy Fair. The series began airing on Cartoon Network on July 29, 2011 with an hour-long premiere, while the UK premiere on Cartoon Network began on 10 September the same year.

Despite an early positive response (with the animation in particular receiving heavy praise from critics), the series failed to make any real impact and viewing figures slowly declined after the first episode, with blame falling on a relatively dark and complicated storyline considering the show was aimed at 6-12 year olds. Merchandise struggled to sell, and as a result the show was cancelled after only one season.

ThunderCats Roar

In other media

Comic books 

There were also several comic book series produced. A ThunderCats comic book series based on the animated series was originally published by Marvel Comics through its Star Comics imprint in 1985, lasting for 3 years and 24 issues. During this time, a new series was published by Marvel UK consisting of 129 issues and was also published for three years. Beginning in 2002 ThunderCats titles were published by Wildstorm Productions, an imprint of DC Comics (Warner Bros.' corporate sibling), and included 5 non-canon mini-series and several one-shots.

Video games 
Two video games based on the franchise exist: ThunderCats: The Lost Eye of Thundera, a 1987 side-scrolling video game; and ThunderCats, a 2012 Nintendo DS game based on the show's revival.

Merchandise 
LJN produced the ThunderCats action figures from 1984 to 1987. The ThunderCats line was based on the animated series which was actually created in 1983. Due to difficulties, it would not air until 1985. Each figure had an action feature of some sort, and the line also included a unique "laser" light-up feature that interacted between the Cats' Lair playset, some figures, and some accessories. Lion-O's eyes and Mumm-Ra's eyes would illuminate when a special battery-powered key ring that came with the figure was pressed into a slot in their backs. PVC companions were packaged with some figures in 1986, including WilyKat with Tygra, WilyKit with Cheetara, Snarf with Lion-O, and Ma-Mutt with Mumm-Ra. The PVC companion figures were also produced as full size articulated figures.

LJN did produce a few variant figures including the young Tygra version and the silver rat-eye daggers for Rataro. There are also a few slight color variations of Lion-O, such as red and orange-haired versions. The third series of figures from 1987 are harder to find along with the Tongue-A-Saurus and Astral Moat Monster. Driller and Stinger are the toughest figures to track down; Stinger's wings are very fragile, making it next to impossible to find a loose, complete figure.

An unproduced final series of figures would have included The Mad Bubbler, Red-Eye of the Lunataks, Ratilla, Cannon-Blaster and Quick-Jaws from the Bezerkers as well as the Feliner, Thunderstrike and Luna Tacker. Photos of these were featured in the 1987 LJN catalog.

In 1987, Elite Systems released the game ThunderCats: The Lost Eye of Thundera, for Commodore64/128, ZX Spectrum, Amstrad CPC, Amiga, and Atari ST personal computers. Many years later, Cartoon Network's official website featured a game that allowed visitors to play as Lion-O and rescue fellow ThunderCats while venturing into Mumm-Ra's tomb (this game, titled, "ThunderCats: Tomb of Mumm-Raa", can be found on an archived Toonami database).

Other ThunderCats merchandise of the 1980s included, among other items, a board game, TV tray table, an electronic racing set, tin lunch box, clothing and apparel. A retro spurt occurred in the mid-1990s and 2000s (decade) that began with the familiar 1980s ThunderCats emblem on T-shirts and has since grown to include new T-shirt designs and various other ThunderCats-themed apparel such as hats and belt buckles, plus a tan backpack with the ThunderCats on it.

In May 2009, Warner Brothers gave Hard Hero the rights to produce a line of collectible statues based on the ThunderCats characters.

In 2011, Bandai released a new toylines, based on both the classic and the 2011 series.

In February 2011, Mezco Toyz acquired the ThunderCats license to produce large scale rotocast figures based on the 1980s animated series. Lion-O was the first announced figure in their toyline.

Jerry Macaluso, owner of Pop Culture Shock, collectible statue company, announced in March 2010 that he had acquired his "dream license". The company went on to produce premium format ThunderCats statues (1:4 scale, over 30 inches) of Lion-O and Mumm-Ra. Prototypes of Cheetara and Tygra were developed and displayed online and at San Diego Comic Con respectively, but didn't reach minimum pre-order thresholds. The prototypes were donated to the ThunderCats Museum in 2014.

See also 

 SilverHawks
 TigerSharks

References

External links 

 ThunderCats (1985–1988) — ThunderCats Lair
 ThunderCats DVD official web site
 ThunderCats DVD official web site for Volume 2
 

1985 American television series debuts
1989 American television series endings
1980s American animated television series
1980s American science fiction television series
1985 Japanese television series debuts
1989 Japanese television series endings
1980s toys
Action figures
American children's animated action television series
American children's animated space adventure television series
American children's animated science fantasy television series
Japanese children's animated action television series
Japanese children's animated space adventure television series
Japanese children's animated science fantasy television series
Anime-influenced Western animated television series
English-language television shows
First-run syndicated television programs in the United States
Rankin/Bass Productions television series
Superhero teams
Animated television series about cats
Animated television series about extraterrestrial life
Television series set on fictional planets
Television series by Lorimar Television
Television series by Warner Bros. Television Studios
1985
Toonami
Television series by Telepictures
Television shows adapted into comics
Television shows adapted into video games
Television series created by Tobin Wolf
Television series created by Leonard Starr
Television series by Lorimar-Telepictures
Television series about mutants